The Amstel Curaçao Race was a road bicycle race held on Curaçao, an island off the Venezuelan coast. The last race was held in 2014. The race was generally about 80 kilometres long and was held at the end of the cycling season. Since it is not as competitive as many other races (it is not included in the UCI World Tour), the Amstel Curaçao Race is considered to be an 'after-party' to the cycling season. Despite its comparative unimportance, the race has been won by several notable cyclists, including classics specialist Tom Boonen and Grand Tour winners Andy Schleck, Alejandro Valverde and Alberto Contador. The race is sponsored by the Netherlands brewery Amstel, who also sponsor the more eminent Amstel Gold Race, a one day classic held in the Netherlands. Contador and Terpstra currently stand as the most prolific winners of the race with two wins each.

List of winners

References

External links
 Official Website

 
Sport in Curaçao
Women's road bicycle races
Men's road bicycle races
Recurring sporting events established in 2002